Boy Blue may refer to:

Boy Blue (Pop Rock Band), a Pop Rock band from northern New Jersey.
"Boy Blue" (Electric Light Orchestra song)
"Boy Blue" (Cyndi Lauper song)
Boy Blue (Fables), a fictional character in the Vertigo comic book series Fables, based on the Little Boy Blue nursery rhyme.
Boy Blue, a fictional villain in the DC Comics universe, associated with Nebula Man

See also
Little Boy Blue (disambiguation)
Blueboy (disambiguation)
The Boy in Blue (disambiguation)